China Mobile Hong Kong Company Limited or CMHK, is a wholly owned subsidiary of China Mobile. The company was incepted in January 1997 and was the first PCS operator to launch such services in Hong Kong. CMHK is currently the largest telecommunications operator in Hong Kong.

History 
In June 1994, the company was first launched and established as PEOPLES Telephone Company Limited in Hong Kong and was awarded a PCS license in 1996 September. In May 2000, it was the first operator in Hong Kong to launch an open portal WAP service.

On 25 February 2004, it changed its name to China Resources Peoples Telephone Company Limited, named by its parent company at that time, China Resources.

In October 2005, it was acquired by China Mobile and renamed to China Mobile Peoples Telephone Company Limited in April 2006. In March 2006, it was delisted and became a fully subsidiary of China Mobile.

In December 2008, it was renamed to China Mobile Hong Kong Company Limited but kept its brand name "Peoples".

In December 2012, China Mobile Hong Kong launched the world's first network TD-LTE/LTE FDD fusion (4G) for roaming.

In December 2013, CMHK launched its new corporate brand, plus its commercial brand "and!".

Service

Mobile network 

As of June 2017, CMHK has 8.274 million subscribers, making them the largest mobile network operator in Hong Kong. As of May 2018, CMHK provided network service 4.5G, 4G LTE (LTE FDD and TD-LTE), 3GHSPA, GPRS and EDGE.

As a subsidiary of China Mobile, CMHK has launched a series of cross-border mobile services for customers traveling between Hong Kong, Mainland China and around the world.

Home broadband 
In 2017, CMHK launched their home broadband services with 3 plans of internet speed selection.

References

External links

Official website

China Mobile
Mobile phone companies of Hong Kong
Telecommunications companies established in 1994
Companies formerly listed on the Hong Kong Stock Exchange